Lazarius Cortez Levingston (born November 16, 1987) is a former American football defensive end. Levingston played college football at LSU. He was drafted by the Seattle Seahawks in the seventh round of the 2011 NFL Draft. He was waived with an injury settlement on August 31, 2012. He was signed by the BC Lions on February 19, 2016 and released by the team on May 29, 2016.

Levingston attended Ruston High School, in Ruston, Louisiana, United States, where he was a three star recruit according to Rivals.com.

References

External links 

 Lazarius Levingston at the official website of the Tampa Bay Buccaneers 
 Lazarius Levingston at the official website of LSU Tigers Athletics 
 Lazarius Levingston at the official website of the Seattle Seahawks

1987 births
Living people
Sportspeople from Ruston, Louisiana
Players of American football from Louisiana
American football defensive ends
Canadian football defensive linemen
American players of Canadian football
LSU Tigers football players
Seattle Seahawks players
Tampa Bay Buccaneers players
BC Lions players